Akshar School is a private English-medium co-ed school located in Diamond Harbour Road, Alipore, Kolkata, West Bengal, India. This school is affiliated to The Indian School Certificate Examiniations (I.S.C).

History
The school was established in 1998.

School is rated 4 out 5 on School Reviews and Listing Platform SchoolMyKids.com

See also
Education in India
List of schools in India
Education in West Bengal

References

External links 
 

Private schools in Kolkata
Alipore
Educational institutions established in 1998
1998 establishments in West Bengal